LISRAM Highway or Langkawi Highway, Federal Route, is a major highway in Langkawi Island, Kedah, Malaysia. LISRAM stands for Langkawi International Shooting Range Malaysia. The Kilometre Zero of the LISRAM Highway starts at Taman Langkawi junctions.

History
The highway was constructed in 1995 and was opened in 1997. During the 1998 Commonwealth Games in Kuala Lumpur, the highway became a main route to Langkawi International Shooting Range Malaysia (LISRAM).

Features

At most sections, the Federal Route 166 was built under the JKR R5 road standard, allowing maximum speed limit of up to 90 km/h.

List of junctions and town

References

Highways in Malaysia
Langkawi
Malaysian Federal Roads